The American Napier was an automobile sold by the Napier Motor Car Company of America from 1904 until 1912.

Initially, the company imported assembled Napiers from England. From late 1904 the cars were assembled under licence in Jamaica Plain, a section of Boston, Massachusetts, in a building formerly used by the B.F. Sturtevant Company. The cars were offered with both American and British built coachwork.

History

In 1907 the company experienced financial problems and production was halted.

In 1909 a new company took over and production restarted in March that year. This lasted until 1911 when the Napier Motor Company took over the interests, but this venture barely lasted a year.

Advertisements

References

History of Massachusetts
Brass Era vehicles
Veteran vehicles
1900s cars
1910s cars